George William Lowles (27 July 1865 – 12 January 1940) was an English first-class cricketer active 1887–89 who played for Middlesex and Surrey. He was a wicketkeeper who was born and died in London.

References

1865 births
1940 deaths
English cricketers
Middlesex cricketers
Surrey cricketers